Don McLean (born 1945) is an American folk singer-songwriter.

Don McLean, Maclean or MacLean may also refer to:

Music
 Don McLean (album), released 1972

People

Sports
 Don MacLean (basketball) (born 1970), American former basketball player
 Don McLean (ice hockey, born 1926) (1926–2009), Canadian ice hockey player
 Don McLean (ice hockey, born 1954), Canadian retired hockey player
 Donald MacLean (ice hockey) (born 1977), Canadian ice hockey forward

Other
 Don Maclean (born 1944), British TV comedian
Don Seymour McLean (1938–1984), American drag performer known as Lori Shannon

See also
 Donald Maclean (disambiguation)